The Our Republican Party, formerly the Korean Patriots' Party (Korean: 대한애국당), was a far-right political party in South Korea known primarily for its Pro-Park Geun-hye stance. It was formed following a split within the New Saenuri Party. The party strongly supported former president Park Geun-hye.

In June 2019, the party elevated Hong Moon-jong, a National Assembly member who left the Liberty Korea Party, as its leader along with incumbent Cho Won-jin. Originally, the party planned to change its name as New Republican Party (신공화당), but faced  a legal issue. On 24 June, the party changed the name to Our Republican Party. The party claimed that the new name came from Park Geun-hye herself.

In March 2020, the party merged with the Liberty Unification Party to form the Liberty Republican Party.

Election results

See also
 Impeachment of Park Geun-hye
 2019 South Korean Capitol attack

References

Political parties in South Korea
Political parties with year of disestablishment missing
Political parties established in 2017
Far-right politics in South Korea
Organizations that oppose LGBT rights
Right-wing populism in South Korea
Right-wing populist parties